Eugene Bleecher Selznick (March 19, 1930 – June 10, 2012) was an American Hall of Fame former volleyball player, and volleyball coach. He played on world championship and Pan American Games championship teams. He was also inducted into the Southern California Jewish Sports Hall of Fame and the International Jewish Sports Hall of Fame.

Early life
Selznick, who was Jewish, was born in Los Angeles, California.  He also lived in Canoga Park, California.  Selznick attended Manual Arts High School in Los Angeles.  He was a physical education major in college, and first began to play volleyball in 1949.

Volleyball career
Volleyball teams that Selznick played on won seven U.S. Open Volleyball Championships in 1951–53, 1956, 1960, 1965, and 1966, as well as seven runner-up titles.  He was the USA Volleyball (USVBA) MVP in 1959, 1960, and 1962.

He was captain of the United States men's national volleyball team from 1953 to 1967.  His teams won the 1960 and 1966 FIVB Volleyball Men's World Championships.

Selznick's teams also won gold medals at the Pan-American Games in 1955 and 1959.  He was a member of the U.S. volleyball team at the Maccabiah Games in 1957, 1961, and 1973.

He was an early supporter of California beach volleyball, and was designated the “First King of Beach Volleyball”. Selznick played with Ev Keller to win the 1950 California Beach Men’s Open. He later played with partner Don McMahon.  He won every Laguna Beach Open from 1955 to 1961.

Selznick introduced Wilt Chamberlain to volleyball, and took him on a national tour in the 1970s.

Coaching career
Selznick coached the US women's volleyball team, which won the gold medal at the 1963 Pan American Games and the 1964 Olympic Games.  He also coached women’s teams that won six USVBA titles (1959–61, and 1963–65).

Selznick coached Olympic athletes Carl Henkel, Misty May, Holly McPeak, and Sinjin Smith.

Honors

Selznick was named to the All America first team 10 times, beginning in 1951.  He won the 1956 international competition All-Star team MVP honor of "Mr. All-World".

The FIVB named Selznick as one of the top American players of the 20th century.  The U.S. Volleyball Hall of Fame honored him as the “All-Time Great Male Player”.  In 1995, Volleyball magazine called him the "Karch Kiraly of his era."

Selznick was elected to the Volleyball Hall of Fame in 1988. In 1990 he was inducted into the Southern California Jewish Sports Hall of Fame.  He was inducted into the International Jewish Sports Hall of Fame in 2002.

See also
 List of select Jewish volleyball players

References

Sources

External links
 Gene's Team Volleyball Club
 

1930 births
2012 deaths
American men's volleyball players
American men's beach volleyball players
American volleyball coaches
Jewish volleyball players
Jewish American sportspeople
Volleyball players at the 1955 Pan American Games
Volleyball players at the 1959 Pan American Games
Pan American Games gold medalists for the United States
Maccabiah Games competitors for the United States
Maccabiah Games competitors by sport
Competitors at the 1957 Maccabiah Games
Competitors at the 1961 Maccabiah Games
Competitors at the 1973 Maccabiah Games
Volleyball players from Los Angeles
Pan American Games medalists in volleyball
Medalists at the 1959 Pan American Games
21st-century American Jews